Foreign relations between Argentina and France, have existed nearly a century. Both states are members of the G-20.

Argentina became an independent nation during the Peninsular War, a conflict between the First French Empire and the Spanish Empire. Argentina was a Spanish territory by that time, as the Viceroyalty of the Río de la Plata, and thus at war with France, but the war never left Europe. The Viceroyalty was never attacked directly by French armies. The French attack to Spain indirectly started the Argentine War of Independence. France recognized Argentina as an independent nation by the end of 1830.

France attempted the French blockade of the Río de la Plata during the War of the Confederation, attempting to remove Juan Manuel de Rosas from power. The blockade lasted for some more years after the defeat of the Peru–Bolivian Confederation by Argentina and Chile. France would attempt another blockade, this time allied with Britain, but Rosas defeated it as well.

History

19th century

Relations between France and Argentina are rooted in this country's independence, proclaimed on July 9, 1816 at the Congress of Tucuman, the French political ideals of the Enlightenment were inspiring movement, born in Buenos Aires on May 25, 1810. Later in the same century, ties between the two countries are strengthened by the influx of French to Argentina, which attracts nearly 250,000 people between 1880 and 1910, mostly Basques, Béarn and aveyroneses migrants. At the same time, France is a model to Argentina for its implementation in many areas, particularly in the area of law (influence of the Civil Code), education, college, science and medicine.
The history of Argentina is so intimately linked to that of France from its origins: a highly symbolic way, the liberator Jose de San Martin lived much longer in France than in Argentina, and spent many years in exile in Paris and the Paris region (Grand Bourg) before ending his days in Boulogne-sur-Mer, where he died on August 17, 1850. 
 Throughout these two centuries, a unique relationship will build between France and Argentina, whose amplitude can be illustrated by the diversity and intensity of the exchanges between the two countries: education, science, arts, economics and construction of large infrastructures. "Golden Years" (1880-1930), who see big names in architecture, as Paul Parter, René Sergent or Norbert Maillart, build some of the most beautiful buildings in the city, are translated with a strong influence of French taste of the time, which deeply marked the landscape of Buenos Aires. The aristocracy of the "breadbasket of the world" had very strong ties to France for their thinking and their way of life. Buenos Aires won this well-deserved title of "Paris of Latin America."

20th century

The first wave of Frenchs who arrived in the country came mostly from the southern regions of Aquitaine and the Pyrenees. They embarked in Bordeaux to America. The French Basques also constituted a numerically important group. While most French immigrants were integrated into urban life in Buenos Aires and major cities of the country, there were also agricultural colonization projects. The most important took place in Pigüé (southwest of the province of Buenos Aires) and Chaco Province (Mayday departments and Bermejo). There were French settlers, along with Germans and Swiss, in the Esperanza colony, founded in 1865 by Aaron Castellanos. Another group of French immigrants settled in Oberá, Misiones.

France helped the Argentine government carry out the Dirty War, playing a significant role in Argentina's state terrorism and systematic torture of political dissidents.

21st century

Bilateral exchanges reached 1.7 million euros in 2013. Capital goods account for 60% of French exports in Argentina, and products related to the automotive sector more than a third.
Imports of Argentine products in France totaled 463 million euros in 2013. These are highly concentrated in the products of agriculture and food industries (more than 80% of the total, or 373 million euros in 2013).
The surplus in the trade balance of France amounted to 774 million euros in 2013. France was, in 2013, the sixth supplier of Argentina.
With a stock of FDI (Foreign Direct Investment) of 2.4 million euros in 2012, France is one of the first investors in Argentina and implanted 250 French companies and groups active in the Argentine growth. This is particularly noticeable in the automotive sector (30% of the French market for both Renault and PSA), wholesale distribution (40% market share), the food industry (Danone and Bongrain) or energy (gas for Total, Schneider Electric) equipment.
Argentina the 3rd regional destination for the French exports, behind Brazil and Mexico, but ahead of Chile and, in total, our third trade partner.

Cultural relations

French immigrants contributed outstanding features to the Argentina culture, especially in the resumption of the production of yerba mate, wine production, sugar (Hileret). Santiago de Liniers, one of the great heroes of Argentina's history, was French. Three Argentine presidents were of French origin: Juan Martín de Pueyrredón, Carlos Pellegrini and Hipolito Yrigoyen; while Alejandro Agustín Lanusse was a great-grandson of an important entrepreneur from Aquitaine. Institutions of the French community, including the French Hospital (French Hospital of Buenos Aires in 2013 has been renamed as César Milstein Hospital), still active, and the socialist group Les Egaux, one of the founders of the Argentine labor movement.

French immigrants as Amadeo Jacques and Paul Groussac had a direct impact on education and Argentine culture. Some Argentine cities, such as Pigüé above, were originated by colonies of French immigrants, and generated an Argentine-French local culture. Carlos Gardel was a native of Languedoc and Provence, the eastern tip of Occitania, became the liberator Hipólito Bouchard who spread the design of the Argentina flag Central America and captured the realistic teaches at the Battle of San Lorenzo.

Architecture

Buenos Aires is a city of diverse architectural influences, especially from Italy, Spain and France. The Parisian flair of Buenos Aires in the San Martin Palace, located on 761 Arenales Street, inspired in the French architecture of the 18th century:

Lunfardo 
Lunfardo is an argot of the Spanish language which appeared in Buenos Aires at the end of the 19th century. It integrated a lot of words and expressions from languages and dialects spoken by immigrants, notably Italians, Spaniards and French. Lunfardo was heavily used in tango lyrics. After 1912, as tango became popular in Paris, French expressions were incorporated into tango lyrics and made their way into lunfardo. It has now become an integral part of the Spanish spoken in Argentina and some of these words are still used on a daily basis.

Examples
 Beguén - Crush (from the French béguin -crush-)
 Bulín - Digs (from the French boulin -hole in the wall of a dolecote where the pigeons nest-)
 Buyón - Food (from the French bouillon -broth-)
 Calotear - To steal (from the French calotter -to steal-)
 Dragonear - To flirt (from the French draguer -to flirt-)
 Fané - Worn out (from the French fané -withered-)
 Franelear - To caress, to heavy pet (from the French faire flanelle -to go to a whorehouse without making use of any woman-)
 Macro - Pimp (from the French maquereau -pimp-)
 Marote - Head (from the French marotte -hatstand-)
 Ragú - Hunger (from the French ragoût -stew-)
 Toilette - Bathroom (from the French toilettes -bathroom-)

Notable people

Cultural, scientific, technical and academic cooperation between France and Argentina are part of a long tradition of exchanges. The crisis of 2001 changed however, the possibilities of intervention and collaboration and has led to a redefinition of priorities for our action. She is oriented towards the technical, scientific and university cooperation, without thereby be neglected our artistic and audiovisual cooperation. It is for us to follow the evolution of the country, offering our experience, our creativity, our contributions to the great debates and promoting synergies.

Science
Enrique Hermitte, Argentine engineer
Bernardo Houssay, Argentine physiologist, to French parents, Nobel Prize winner
Luis Federico Leloir, Argentine doctor and biochemist, Nobel Prize winner
Alicia Moreau de Justo, Argentine physician, French parents

Literature
Carlos Alvarado-Larroucau, writer
Augusto Belin, writer, French father
Adolfo Bioy Casares, writer
Eugenio Cambaceres, writer, French father
Andrés Chabrillón, poet, French parents
Julio Cortázar, Argentine writer, French Argentine mother
Emilio Daireaux, French-Argentine writer and journalist
Paul Groussac, writer, literary critic, historian and librarian
José Hernández, writer, French Argentine mother
Arturo Jauretche, writer of French Basque ancestry
Federico Jeanmaire, writer
Gregorio de Laferrère, playwright
Ana Emilia Lahitte, writer
Leopoldo Marechal, Argentine writer, French Uruguayan father
Julio Meinvielle, priest and writer
Ulyses Petit de Murat, poet and screenwriter
Manuel Peyrou, writer

Academia
Amédée Jacques, French-born Argentine pedagogue and philosopher
Ernesto Laclau, political theorist

Resident diplomatic missions 
 Argentina has an embassy in Paris.
 France has an embassy in Buenos Aires.

See also 
 Argentines in France
 French Argentines
 2022 FIFA World Cup Final
 Argentina–European Union relations

Bibliography

References

External links 
 List of Treaties ruling the relations Argentina and France (Argentine Foreign Ministry, in Spanish)
 Argentine embassy in Paris (in French only)
 French Ministry of Foreign Affairs about the relations with Argentina
  French embassy in Buenos Aires (in French and Spanish only)

 
France
Bilateral relations of France